Forbes compiles the finances of all 32 NHL teams to produce an annual ranking of the best franchises in terms of valuation. The valuations are composed of the monetary worth of the sport, market, stadium deals, and brand. These areas are supported by applying financial metrics such as debt and operating income to each one.

The latest ranking reported that the New York Rangers is the most valuable NHL franchise after the 2021–22 NHL season. The fastest growing NHL franchise is the Edmonton Oilers, with a 136.1% increase in valuation since the 2017–18 NHL season ($0.575 billion to $1.275 billion). The Rangers have been the most valuable NHL team since the 2014–15 NHL season, totaling up to eight consecutive years.

Several media outlets have referenced in related news or conducts analytic journalism when the ranking comes out, such as CBS  and Bleacher Report. The NHL has consistently published news about the rankings since the early renditions. The report has also applied more context to NHL trends, such as the Edmonton Oilers doubling in value in just one year. Particularly, the Oilers have recently been clinching the playoffs consistently that aligns well with the opening of Rogers Place and new media deals.

Ranking
Rankings as of December 14, 2022 (2021–22 NHL season)

Composition

Historical valuations

Notes

See also

 Forbes' list of the most valuable sports teams
 List of professional sports leagues by revenue

References

National Hockey League lists
Sports world rankings
Top sports lists
Forbes lists
21st century-related lists